The 1998 Humboldt State Lumberjacks football team represented Humboldt State University during the 1998 NAIA football season. Humboldt State competed in the NAIA Columbia Football Association.

The 1998 Lumberjacks were led by eighth-year head coach Fred Whitmire. They played home games at the Redwood Bowl in Arcata, California. Humboldt State finished the season with a record of four wins and seven losses (4–7, 3–2 CFA). The Lumberjacks were outscored by their opponents 222–288 for the season.

Schedule

References

Humboldt State
Humboldt State Lumberjacks football seasons
Humboldt State Lumberjacks football